The Char-Lan Rebels are a junior ice hockey team in Williamstown, Ontario.  Between 2014-15 and the end of the 2019-2020 seasons, the EOJHL and the CCHL set a new agreement  in an attempt to create a better player development model. This resulted in the league re-branding itself as the Central Canada Hockey League Tier 2 (CCHL2), and shrinking to 16 teams and two divisions. The league reverted to the Eastern Ontario Junior Hockey League for 2021.

History
The Rebels have an intense rivalry with the Alexandria Glens.  The rivalry has been touted as "The Battle of Glengarry" within the local community. Games between the teams are often heated events.

Season-by-season results

External links
Official Rebels Website
CCHL2 Webpage

Eastern Ontario Junior B Hockey League teams
Ice hockey clubs established in 1979
1979 establishments in Ontario